Elena Doronina (born 14 August 1981) is a Russian bobsledder who has competed since 2004. She finished ninth in the two-woman event at the 2010 Winter Olympics in Vancouver.

Doronina's best finish at the FIBT World Championships was 15th in the two-woman event at St. Moritz in 2007.

References
 

1981 births
Bobsledders at the 2010 Winter Olympics
Living people
Olympic bobsledders of Russia
Russian female bobsledders
Place of birth missing (living people)
21st-century Russian women